Watchaug Pond is a kettle pond (lake) located in southern Rhode Island, in the town of Charlestown.  It is surrounded by the John Vincent Gormley 8-mile loop trail which was dedicated by Senator Jack Reed in 1999. The Vin Gormley trail is the second to last leg of the North-South Trail that transects the state. In addition it is near the Audubon Society's Kimball Wildlife Refuge. The  pond is within  of public land. There is a public cement boat ramp on Sanctuary Road. The Kettle Pond Visitor Center, operated by U.S. Fish and Wildlife Service and the Rhode Island National Wildlife Refuge, hosts school field trips and educational programs about the pond's flora, fauna and habitats.

External links
 
 Kettle Pond Visitor Center at Watchuag Pond

Charlestown, Rhode Island
Lakes of Rhode Island
Bodies of water of Washington County, Rhode Island
Protected areas of Washington County, Rhode Island
Ponds of the United States